The Broadnose worm eel (Myrophis platyrhynchus) is an eel in the family Ophichthidae (worm/snake eels). It was described by Charles Marcus Breder Jr. in 1927. It is a tropical, marine eel which is known from the western central Atlantic Ocean, including Bermuda, the Bahamas, Cuba, Lesser Antilles, Belize, and Brazil. It is known to dwell at a depth of 186 metres, and inhabits protected or semi-protected bays and tidal creeks.

References

Fish described in 1927
Myrophis